Prunus annularis is a species of Prunus in the family Rosaceae. It is native to cloud forests along the Pacific coasts of Mexico and Central America. It is a tree 5 to 12m tall. It is fed upon by caterpillars of the genus Oxynetra.

References

annularis
Flora of Mexico
Flora of Central America
Plants described in 1915